In music, Op. 40 stands for Opus number 40. Compositions that are assigned this number include:

 Arnold – Symphony No. 2
 Barber – Antony and Cleopatra
 Beethoven – Romance for violin and orchestra no. 1 Op. 40
 Brahms – Horn Trio
 Bruch – Hermione
 Chopin – Polonaises Op. 40
 Dohnányi – Symphony No. 2
 Dvořák – Nocturne in B major
 Elgar – Cockaigne (In London Town)
 Erler – Ein Heldenleben
 Finzi – Cello Concerto
 Holberg – Holberg Suite
 Mendelssohn – Piano Concerto No. 2
 Rachmaninoff – Piano Concerto No. 4
 Reger – Zwei Choralphantasien, Op. 40
 Robbins – The Concert
 Saint-Saëns – Danse macabre
 Schumann – 5 Lieder
 Schwabe – Fervaal
 Shostakovich – Cello Sonata